The Port of Busan is the largest port in South Korea, located in the city of Busan, South Korea. Its location is known as Busan Harbor.

The port is ranked sixth in the world's container throughput and is the largest seaport in South Korea. The port is operated by the Busan Port Authority, which was founded in 2004 as a public company. In 2019, around 22 million TEU were handled at 10 container terminals in Busan.

History 
The Port of Busan was established in 1876 as a small port with strict trading between Korea, China and Japan. It is situated at the mouth of the Nakdong River facing the Tsushima Island of Japan. During the Korean War (1950-1953), Busan was among the few places North Korea did not invade, causing war refugees to flee to the city of Busan. At that time Busan's port was crucial to receive war materials and aid, such as fabrics and processed foods to keep the economy stable. In the 1970s, a rise in the footwear and veneer industries caused factory workers to migrate to Busan, bringing Busan's population from 1.8 million to 3 million.

The Port of Busan continued to grow and by 2003 the port was the fourth largest container port in the world. South Korea accounted for 0.7% of global trade in 1970, but by 2003 it went up to 2.5%. 50% of the Busan's manufacturing jobs are related to exports, and 83% of the country's exports are containerized, making Busan the country's largest container and general cargo port. Compared to the Port of Busan, Inchon port handles only 7% of containers. Easy access to the Port of Busan between Japan, Singapore, and Hong Kong contribute to its vast growth.

Currently the Port of Busan is the fifth busiest container port in the world and the tenth busiest port in North-east Asia. It is developed, managed, and operated by the Busan Port Authority (BPA) established in 2004. Today the Port of Busan consists of four ports- North Port, South Port, Gamcheon Port, and Dadaepo Port, an International Passenger Terminal and the Gamman container terminal. The North Port provides passenger handling facilities and cargo, and with Gamcheon Port's help more cargo volumes can be handled (Ship Technology). The South Port is home to the Busan Cooperative Fish Market which is the largest fishing base in Korea, and it handles 30% of the total marine volume. The Dadaepo Port located west of the Busan Port, mainly handles coastal catches.

In 2007 the Busan Port handled cargo containing fertilizers, meat, scrap metal, petroleum and other gases, crude petroleum, coal, leather, fats and oils, iron ore, rough wood, natural sand, milling industry products, and sugar. In 2016, South Korea exported a total of $515B and imported $398B. Top exports of South Korea are integrated circuits, cars, refined petroleum, passenger and cargo ships, and vehicle parts. South Korea exports the most to China, the United States, Vietnam, Hong Kong, and Japan. Imports to South Korea mainly come from China, Japan, the United States, Germany, and other Asian countries. In 2017 Busan processed more than 20 million TEU, twenty-foot equivalents (a measure used to estimate the capacity of container ships).

The port is part of the Maritime Silk Road that runs from the Chinese coast towards the southern tip of India to Mombasa, from there through the Suez Canal to the Mediterranean and there to the Upper Adriatic region of Trieste with its rail connections to Central and Eastern Europe.

The current traffic volumes and urban population categorize Busan as a Large-Port Metropolis, using the Southampton system of port-city classification.

Port Statistics

Incidents 
In 2021, a big cargo ship hit a number of cranes as it was parking. There were no injuries or deaths.

Sister ports 
The Port of Busan also has 6 sister ports (listed in order of dates).
 – Port of Southampton, United Kingdom (1978)
 – Port of Seattle, United States (1981)
 – Port of Osaka, Japan (1985)
 – Port of Rotterdam, Netherlands (1985)
 – Port of New York & New Jersey, USA (1988)
 – Port of Shanghai, China (1994)

References 

 .

Notes

External links 

Jung District, Busan
Transport in Busan
Buildings and structures in Busan
Busan